List of mayors of Wilton, Wiltshire, England:

1391–2: William Chitterne

References

Wilton
Wilton